Jack Baer (October 29, 1914 – March 9, 2002) was a college football and baseball player and a college baseball coach.
Baer was the son of Herman and Anna Baer. He was a 1933 Shawnee (Oklahoma) High School graduate where he was an all-round athlete. He was offered a contract with the New York Yankees but opted to play football and baseball at the University of Oklahoma. He played quarterback and set records as a punter and kicker. He was named All-Big Six. At one point he held the record for field goals after booting a 47 yarder. He also played centerfield for the Sooners. Baer served in the navy as a Lt. during World War II as a physical fitness instructor and played football at Del Monte, Calif., Pre-Flight School. He was the fourth head baseball coach at the University of Oklahoma beginning his tenure in 1942 before he went in the Navy. During his tenure, Oklahoma won one national championship in 1951, made five NCAA Tournament appearances and won 6 conference titles. His team had a .529 winning percentage. He was coach until he retired in 1968 then worked in the football program as a scout and assistant coach and finally retiring as equipment manager. He's buried in the IOOF Cemetery in Norman, Oklahoma. 

Baer's Oklahoma team won the 1951 College World Series.

Head coaching record

References

External links
1951 Baseball National Championship at SoonerSports.com

1914 births
2002 deaths
United States Navy personnel of World War II
Oklahoma Sooners football players
Oklahoma Sooners baseball players
Oklahoma Sooners baseball coaches